Timothy Gibson Bowden  (born 2 August 1937), is an Australian author, radio and television broadcaster and producer, and oral historian. He was born in Hobart, Tasmania, and studied at the University of Tasmania, where he graduated with a Bachelor of Arts degree.

Bowden's work has included hosting the Australian Broadcasting Corporation program Backchat (1986–1994), producing This Day Tonight during the 1970s, and founding the ABC's Social History Unit. His other productions include Prisoners of War – Australians Under Nippon and the 24-part series Taim Bilong Masta – The Australian Involvement with Papua New Guinea.

During the 1990s he produced several notable documentaries on Australian research in the Antarctic.

Books

Changi Photographer
 One Crowded Hour
 Neil Davis, Combat Cameraman
 The Backchat Book
The Way My Father Tells It – The Story of An Australian Life
 Antarctica And Back in Sixty Days
The Silence Calling – Australians in Antarctica 1947–97
Penelope Goes West – On the Road from Sydney to Margaret River and Back
Penelope Bungles to Broome
Spooling Through – An Irreverent Memoir
This Can’t Happen to Me! – Tackling Type 2 Diabetes
No Tern Unstoned – Musings at Breakfast
The Devil in Tim – Travels in Tasmania
Aunty’s Jubilee! – Celebrating 50 years of ABC-TV
Down Under in the Top End – Penelope Heads North
Stubborn Buggers
Larrikins in Khaki – Tales of irreverence and courage from World War II Diggers

Awards
Member of the Order of Australia, 1994
Centenary Medal, 2001
Honorary Doctorate of Letters, University of Tasmania, 1997

References

Tim Bowden (Australian Broadcasting Corporation)

1937 births
Living people
Australian television presenters
Oral historians
Australian historians
Members of the Order of Australia
Recipients of the Centenary Medal
University of Tasmania alumni
People from Hobart